The Covina massacre was a mass murder carried out on Christmas Eve by a disgruntled ex-husband in Los Angeles County, California, United States, in 2008. Bruce Jeffrey Pardo, who was wearing a Santa costume, entered a property belonging to his former in-laws in Covina and killed nine people either by shooting or arson from the fire he started. Three people, including Pardo's ex-wife and his former in-laws, were declared missing pending identification of their bodies. The 45-year-old local resident killed himself with a self-inflicted gunshot to the head at his brother's residence in the early hours of Christmas Day. At the time, the incident was the deadliest mass shooting in Los Angeles County history, being surpassed 14 years later by the 2023 Monterey Park shooting.

Police speculated that Pardo's divorce, which had been finalized on December 18 only one week before the killings, was a significant factor for the violence and why Pardo had entered the home on 1129 East Knollcrest Drive during a Christmas Eve party and killed his ex-wife and her relatives.

Killings
At approximately 11:30 p.m. PST, 45-year-old Bruce Jeffrey Pardo, dressed in a Santa Claus suit, knocked on the door of his former in-laws' house, occupied by about 25 people, with a gift-wrapped package containing a rolling air compressor converted to deliver gasoline from it and at least four 9mm semi-automatic handguns. Moments after the door opened, Pardo pulled out the handguns and immediately shot his 8-year-old niece Katrina Yuzefpolsky, the daughter of Leticia Yuzefpolsky, a sister of Sylvia Pardo, as she ran to greet him, injuring her in the face.  He then fired indiscriminately at fleeing party-goers. Police speculate that Pardo may have stood over and pointedly executed some of the victims, using the other handguns.

After opening fire with the handguns, Pardo unwrapped the package containing the compressor and used it to spray gasoline to set the home ablaze. Nine people died from either gunfire or flames, and three others were wounded: Yuzefpolsky was shot in the face with severe but non-life-threatening injuries, a 16-year-old girl shot and wounded in the back, and a 20-year-old woman who suffered a broken ankle jumping out of the second-floor window. One survivor escaped during the attack and ran to a neighbor's house where they called authorities. Due to the intensity of the fire, identification of the victims was done with dental and medical records.

After setting the home on fire, Pardo put on his street clothes and drove his Dodge Caliber rental car to his brother's house in Sylmar about 30 miles away from the crime scene, where he was later found dead from a self-inflicted gunshot wound. His brother was not present in the home at the time of Pardo's death. It was initially believed that Pardo intended to flee to Canada by plane since he had bought an airline ticket for a flight on Air Canada. However, it was subsequently discovered that the flight itinerary, on Northwest Airlines, was from Los Angeles to Moline, Illinois (with a layover in Minnesota). Pardo had called days before to tell a high school friend that he was planning to visit but investigators were unsure if he actually intended to visit or if the flight was to fool investigators. He had visited the friend before in October 2008. Other reports stated that the Santa suit had melted during the flamethrower portion of the attack and had adhered to his skin so not all of it could be removed.

However, suffering from severe third-degree burns on his arms stemming from the blaze, Pardo decided to go against the initial plan. Police found $17,000 in cash cling-wrapped on his legs inside a girdle. His rental car, parked one block from his brother's house, had remnants of his Santa suit. Also recovered from the scene were four 13-round capacity handguns that were empty, and at least 200 rounds of ammunition. Suggesting that what had been inside the car was being treated as a threat, a bomb squad while attempting to remove a portion of the Santa suit with a robot, accidentally started a fire in the vehicle, burning and destroying it. At Pardo's house in Montrose, police had recovered five empty boxes for semiautomatic handguns, a Benelli M2 Tactical shotgun and a container for high-octane fuel tank gasoline. They also found what was described as a "virtual bomb factory" in his home.

Victims
At least three victims' deaths were caused by gunshot wounds alone, while four others died from a combination of both gunshot wounds and fire. Two other deaths stemmed from the fire alone. Some of the bodies were burned and had to be identified by dental records. At least thirteen children were orphaned after the massacre, and two others lost one parent. The victims include:

Motivation
Pardo lived in the San Fernando Valley and was a graduate of John H. Francis Polytechnic High School in Sun Valley, Los Angeles, and California State University, Northridge. He had worked at the Jet Propulsion Laboratory in La Cañada Flintridge. In 2004, he met Sylvia Pardo (nee Ortega).

Police speculate that the motive of Pardo's attack was related to marital problems. After the couple wed in January 2006, their marriage quickly fell apart within the first year because Pardo refused to open a joint bank account with Sylvia; he also expected his wife to use her own finances to take care of her own three children. There is some speculation that the divorce may have also been caused by Pardo concealing a child from a previous relationship. This child had been severely injured in a swimming pool accident several years prior for which Pardo did not pay child or spousal support.

In June 2008, a divorce court ordered Pardo to pay $1,785 a month in spousal support. During the divorce proceedings, Pardo confided to a friend his wife was "taking him to the cleaners." In July, Pardo, who had no criminal record or history of violence, was fired from his job as an electrical engineer at ITT Corporation Electronic Systems Radar Systems for billing false hours. The divorce court suspended the support payments due to financial hardship. However, as part of the divorce settlement, Pardo was required to pay his ex-wife $10,000, and she was permitted to keep her wedding ring and family dog. Pardo complained to the court that Sylvia was living with her parents, not paying rent, and had spent lavishly on a luxury car, gambling trips to Las Vegas, meals at expensive restaurants, massages, and golf lessons. Pardo and Sylvia finalized their divorce a week prior to the attack.

Depiction in media

Music
Poly Styrene, the lead singer of X-Ray Spex, recorded a song in 2010 called "Black Christmas", which contains references to the massacre.

Film
Silent Night was partially based on the massacre. In the film, a character tells the story of a man who donned a Santa suit, and used a homemade flamethrower to attack a Christmas party being attended by his ex-wife.

See also

List of massacres in the United States
 List of homicides in California
 2011 Grand Rapids mass murder
 2011 Seal Beach shooting
 Azana Spa shooting
 2014 Harris County shooting
 Carthage nursing home shooting

References

External links
 Covina Holiday Murders – San Gabriel Valley Tribune
 Inside the mind of a killer 'Santa' – Los Angeles Times

  

2000s in Los Angeles County, California
Murder in Los Angeles County, California
Deaths by firearm in California
2008 murders in the United States
December 2008 events in the United States
Arson in California
Car and truck bombings in the United States
Massacres in the United States
Mass murder in 2008
Mass murder in California
Mass murder in the United States
Murder–suicides in California
2008 mass shootings in the United States
Mass shootings in the United States
History of Los Angeles County, California
2008 in California
Crimes in Los Angeles County, California
Attacks in the United States in 2008
Covina, California
December 2008 crimes
Mass shootings in California
Family murders